Kentucky Route 166 (KY 166) is a  state highway in Fulton County, Kentucky. It runs from Kentucky Route 125 southeast of Hickman to U.S. Route 45 and Kentucky Route 1648 in northwestern Fulton.

Major intersections

References

Transportation in Fulton County, Kentucky
0166